Maurizio Bucci (born 29 August 1923) is an Italian diplomat, a former Permanent Representative to the United Nations in New York of Italy and a former Chairman of UNICEF (1986–1987).

Career
He joined the Ministry of Foreign Affairs in 1949, and has served as cabinet secretary to Carlo Sforza and Alcide De Gasperi. He was a member of the Italian delegation that negotiated the treaty for the establishment of the European Coal and Steel Community and the European Defence Community. He also participated in the negotiations on the Treaty of Rome.

He was ambassador in Damascus from 1973 to 1976 and in Brasilia from 1976 to 1979. He then served as Director General for Economic Affairs at the Ministry of Foreign Affairs from 1979 to 1984 and Permanent Representative to the United Nations in New York from 1984. In that capacity, he was also Chairman of the UNICEF Executive Board from 1986 to 1987.

Honors
 Order of Merit of the Italian Republic 1st Class / Knight Grand Cross – January 5, 1982

See also 
 Ministry of Foreign Affairs (Italy)
 Foreign relations of Italy

References

Chairmen and Presidents of UNICEF
Permanent Representatives of Italy to the United Nations
Ambassadors of Italy to Brazil
Ambassadors of Italy to Syria
Italian officials of the United Nations
Italian diplomats
20th-century diplomats
1923 births
People from the Province of Isernia
Living people